Androzeugma is a genus of moths in the family Geometridae.

Geometrinae
Geometridae genera